Savenac Nursery Historic District is located near Haugan in Mineral County, Montana. It is 15 miles from St. Regis, Montana. Savenac was once one of the largest and oldest USDA Forest Service tree nurseries in the western United States, operating from 1907 until 1969. The nursery was created by Elers Koch, of the Forest Service, who also helped fight the Great Fire of 1910 that destroyed much of the Rocky Mountains in the northern part of USA, including the nursery. Savenac once produced over 12 million seedlings annually for use in reforestation of national forests throughout the United States.  Its former operations have been moved to the Coeur d'Alene Nursery in Idaho.

Savenac was listed in the National Register of Historic Places August 16, 1999.  Today ten buildings built during the 1930s by Company 956 of the Civilian Conservation Corps remain at the site, together with landscaped grounds, a stone bridge, interpretive trails and a small arboretum.

References

External links
"Savenac Nursery data"
“Lolo National Forest”
“Mineral County, Montana”

Government buildings on the National Register of Historic Places in Montana
Colonial Revival architecture in Montana
Protected areas of Mineral County, Montana
Civilian Conservation Corps in Montana
Lolo National Forest
Farms on the National Register of Historic Places in Montana
1907 establishments in Montana
Historic districts on the National Register of Historic Places in Montana
National Register of Historic Places in Mineral County, Montana
Plant nurseries
Buildings and structures completed in 1907